Jonathan Simon Coates (born 27 June 1975) is a Welsh former professional footballer who played as a left winger.

Career
Coates made 280 appearances in the Football League in two spells for Swansea City, and also spent time with Barry Town, Cheltenham Town, Woking, Carmarthen Town, Newport County, Aberystwyth Town, Port Talbot Town, Morriston Town and Haverfordwest County.

Honours
Swansea City
Football League Third Division play-offs runner-up: 1997

References

External links
Wales stats at 11v11

1975 births
Living people
Welsh footballers
Swansea City A.F.C. players
Barry Town United F.C. players
Cheltenham Town F.C. players
Woking F.C. players
Carmarthen Town A.F.C. players
Newport County A.F.C. players
Aberystwyth Town F.C. players
Port Talbot Town F.C. players
Haverfordwest County A.F.C. players
English Football League players
Association football wingers
Morriston Town A.F.C. players